The Battle to the Weak is a novel by Welsh-born writer Hilda Vaughan.

Publication
The Battle to the Weak was Vaughan's first novel, published in 1925.

Reception
According to Christopher Newman, though her literary technique would develop throughout her career, The Battle to the Weak contains "virtually all the themes developed in her later works", especially those of duty and self-sacrifice. The novel was very favourably received, with reviews noting the accomplished character of the work, in spite of it being her first. The Western Mail said of it "Wales depicted truly at last."

References

Citations

Sources
 Newman, Christopher (1981). Hilda Vaughan. Cardiff: University of Wales Press. 
 Thomas, Lucy (2008). "The Fiction of Hilda Vaughan (1892–1985): Negotiating the Boundaries of Welsh Identity". PhD Thesis. University of Cardiff. 12 Mar. 2014.

Novels by Hilda Vaughan
1925 British novels